The 2022–23 Coastal Carolina Chanticleers men's basketball team represented Coastal Carolina University in the 2022–23 NCAA Division I men's basketball season. The Chanticleers, led by 16th-year head coach Cliff Ellis, played their home games at the HTC Center in Conway, South Carolina as members of the Sun Belt Conference.

Previous season
The Chanticleers finished the 2021–22 season 19–14, 8–8 in Sun Belt Play to finish in 7th place. They lost in the first round of the Sun Belt tournament to Georgia Southern. They received an invitation to the new  The Basketball Classic where they defeated Maryland Eastern Shore, Florida Gulf Coast, and South Alabama to advance to the championship game where they lost to Fresno State.

Offseason

Departures

Incoming transfers

Recruiting
There were no incoming recruits for the class of 2022.

Preseason

Preseason Sun Belt Conference poll 
The Chanticleers were picked to finish in eighth place in the conference's preseason poll. Junior center Essam Mostafa was named preseason All-SBC Second Team.

Roster

Schedule and results

|-
!colspan=12 style=| Non-conference regular season

|-
!colspan=12 style=| Sun Belt Conference regular season

|-
!colspan=12 style=| Sun Belt tournament

Source

References

Coastal Carolina Chanticleers men's basketball seasons
Coastal Carolina Chanticleers
Coastal Carolina Chanticleers men's basketball